Wageningen is a municipality and a historic city in the central Netherlands, in the province of Gelderland. It is famous for Wageningen University, which specialises in life sciences.

Demographics

Inhabitants by nationality 
71,68% is Dutch, 28,32% has a migration background.

Geography
Wageningen is situated on the north bank of the Nederrijn (the Dutch portion of the Lower Rhine) part of the Gelderse valley (Dutch: Gelderse Vallei) and the Veluwe, of which the southwest hill is called the Wageningse Berg. Wageningen can be reached by car from highways A12 via the N781, A15 via the N233 and N225, and A50 via the N225, and from the Ede-Wageningen railway station via a 20-minute bus drive to the Wageningen central terminal (see below).,

Topographic map of the municipality of Wageningen, July 2013 (click to enlarge)

History

The oldest known settlements in the Wageningen area were located north of today's town centre.  They were mentioned as early as 828. During the early Middle Ages a small church was built on the hill east of the town. Several wood farms have been found near the top of the hill. In the twelfth century people settled at what is currently the Bergstraat. Close to Hotel de Wereld a stone floor has been found dating back to this period. After the construction of a dike to protect the city from the acidic water from the moors that then occupied the Gelderse Vallei (the current Hoogstraat), the oldest part of the present city was built to the south. The parts of the city north of the Hoogstraat were built later. Wageningen received city rights in 1263. The city was protected by a city wall and a moat, and in 1526 a castle was built. The castle was dismantled during the 18th century, but the foundations of three of the towers and part of the wall remain visible today.

The people, city, and institutions of Wageningen suffered greatly during World War II. The central part of Wageningen was destroyed by artillery fire soon after the German invasion of the country in May 1940. The town is also famous for its role at the end of the war: Wageningen was the site of the surrender of Oberbefehlshaber Niederlande supreme commander Generaloberst Johannes Blaskowitz, to I Canadian Corps commander Lieutenant-General Charles Foulkes, on 5 May 1945, officially ending the war in the Netherlands. The generals negotiated the terms of surrender in the Hotel de Wereld, near the center of the city. Now, each year on 5 May, celebrated as Liberation Day in the Netherlands, Wageningen hosts a large festival. On this occasion, veteran soldiers parade through the city and are honoured for their service, and around 120,000 people visit the pop-podia around the city.

Education and research 

In 1918 the town acquired its first institution of higher education, the Landbouwhogeschool Nederland (Netherlands Agricultural College), which was based on the previous agricultural college founded in 1876, and which later became Wageningen University.  This initiated the development from a small historical town into a modern technological community, a process which still continues today.

Wageningen University and Research Centre (WUR), including associated institutes, now employs about 7400 people.

Today, Wageningen is also the central city in Food Valley, the Dutch food & nutrition cluster concentrated around WUR, and comprising many institutes, companies and facilities in the food & nutrition field. Food Valley is regarded as the largest food & nutrition Research & Development cluster in the world. One such firm, Keygene, a plant research company in Wageningen, developed AFLP in the early 1990s and collaborated with Beijing Genomics Institute to sequence the entire genome of Brassica napus.

Sports teams
The city had its own professional football (soccer) club, FC Wageningen, which won the KNVB-beker (KNVB Cup) twice. The club went bankrupt in 1992 and played its last match in May 1992 against NAC Breda.

The city is also home to the largest Korfball club in the country, KV Wageningen.

Traffic and transport 

Wageningen is situated on the N225 provincial road, between Driebergen and Arnhem. The N781 provincial road connects Wageningen to the A12 national highway, to the north of the city. A small ferry (for cars, bikes, and pedestrians) crosses the Nederrijn to the south of the city, at Lexkesveer; from there, drivers can connect to the A15 national highway, via the N836 provincial road.

Several firms provide public bus service in and to Wageningen. From the Wageningen central bus terminal, lines connect to Rhenen, Tiel, Veenendaal, Utrecht, Oosterbeek, and Arnhem, and the Ede-Wageningen railway station. Further connections via bus, including to the Hoge Veluwe National Park and the Kröller-Müller Museum, also may be made at the Ede-Wageningen station. Bus service includes the following:

Politics

Municipal council 
Composition of the Wageningen municipal council since 1982:

*Participated in 1986 with the name PPCE, the abbreviation of PSP-PPR-CPN-EVP.**Participated in 1998 as a combination of the RPF and the GPV.

Mayor 

Wageningen's mayor Floor Vermeulen (m) (VVD), will be installed on Friday 18 June 2021.

Notable residents 

 Johannes de Raey (1622 in Wageningen – 1702) a Dutch philosopher, an early Cartesian
 Gerrit Zegelaar (1719 – 1794 in Wageningen) a Dutch painter
 August Falise (1875 in Wageningen – 1936) was a Dutch sculptor and minter of medals 
 Li Edelkoort (born 1950 in Wageningen) a Dutch fashion and design trend forecaster 
 Eline Flipse  (born 1954 in Wageningen) a film director of documentaries 
 Alexander Pechtold (born 1965), politician, former local Mayor, lives in Wageningen 
 Jeroen Dijsselbloem (born 1966) a Dutch politician and economist, went to Wageningen University  1985/1991
 Lisa Hordijk (born 1987 in Wageningen) a Dutch singer, won the second season of X Factor.

 Nikkie de Jager (born 1994 in Wageningen) a Dutch makeup artist, beauty vlogger, and co-host of Eurovision Song Contest 2021

Sport 
 Aletta van Manen  (born 1958 in Wageningen) a retired Dutch field hockey defender, team gold medallist at the 1984 Summer Olympics
 Ed van Es (born 1959 in Wageningen) a former water polo player, competed at the 1984 Summer Olympics
 Annelies Maas (born 1960 in Wageningen) freestyle swimmer, bronze medallist at the 1980 Summer Olympics
 Jacqueline Toxopeus (born 1964 in Wageningen) a former Dutch field hockey goalkeeper 
 Bart Voskamp (born 1968 in Wageningen) a retired road bicycle racer
 Annemiek van Vleuten (born 1982 in Vleuten) a Dutch road racing cyclist
 Botic van de Zandschulp (born 1995 in Wageningen) a Dutch tennis player, was in the quarterfinals 2021 US Open

Places of interest

(Including nearby)
 International Club Association
 Airborne Museum 'Hartenstein', Oosterbeek
 Botanical Gardens in Wageningen
 De Casteelse Poort Museum
 Het Depot Museum
 Hoge Veluwe National Park, Ede
 Hotel de Wereld
 Kröller-Müller Museum, Ede/Otterlo
 Netherlands Open Air Museum, Arnhem
 Ouwehands Zoo, Rhenen
 Wageningen University Campus

Twin towns 
Wageningen has two twin towns:

The city has a project relation with the towns: Zhangzhou, China and Ndiza,  (Rwanda).

Gallery

See also
 Dijkgraaf, Gelderland
 
 
  In Boek Weg van de Wederopbouw Wageningen, 'M. van den Wijngaart, Modernisme rondom een traditionele kern p. 58–85, 2016, 186p

References

External links

 Official website

 
Municipalities of Gelderland
Populated places in Gelderland